Sotteville-sur-Mer (literally Sotteville on Sea) is a commune in the Seine-Maritime department in the Normandy region in north-western France.

Geography
Here, huge chalk cliffs rise up from a pebble beach to overlook the English Channel. Access to the beach is by 231 steps cut out of the cliffs.

Heraldry

Population

Places of interest
 The church of Notre-Dame, dating from the thirteenth century.
 The chapel of Notre-Dame-du-Val, dating from the tenth century.

See also
Communes of the Seine-Maritime department

References

External links

 Official website of Sotteville-sur-Mer 

Communes of Seine-Maritime
Populated coastal places in France